Dom Pedro (Lord Peter) is the traditional Portuguese appellation of several kings of Portugal:
 Peter I of Portugal
 Peter II of Portugal
 Peter III of Portugal
 Pedro IV of Portugal
 Pedro V of Portugal
and of the two 19th-century Emperors of Brazil:
 Pedro I of Brazil
 Pedro II of Brazil

Others
 Dom Pedro V Theatre
 D. Pedro V High School
 The Dom Pedro aquamarine
 Steamship Wyreema renamed to Dom Pedro I